Enrollment (American spelling) or enrolment (British spelling) may refer to: 
 Matriculation, the process of initiating attendance to a school
 The act of entering an item into a roll or scroll.
 The total number of students properly registered and/or attending classes at a school (see List of largest universities by enrollment)
 Concurrent enrollment, the process in which high school students enrol at a university or college usually to attain college credit
 The participation of human subjects in a clinical trial
 Biometrics, the process of adding a user's credentials to the authentication system.
 The process of being entered onto an electoral roll
 Membership in a federally recognized American Indian tribe
 The defensive curling of a trilobite over its soft ventral organs.
 Volvation, the defensive curling of other arthropods such as pill bugs rolling themselves into a "pill".

Enrollment may also refer to: 
 Enrolled bill, a legislative bill in the United States that has been enacted by a legislature

See also
 Roll (disambiguation)